Roy Hart Jr. (born July 10, 1965) is a former American football defensive tackle. He was drafted by the Seattle Seahawks in the sixth round of the 1988 NFL Draft. He played college football at South Carolina.

Hart has also played for the London Monarchs, Los Angeles Raiders, Hamilton Tiger-Cats and Las Vegas Posse.

References 

1965 births
Living people
People from Tifton, Georgia
American football defensive tackles
Canadian football defensive linemen
South Carolina Gamecocks football players
Seattle Seahawks players
London Monarchs players
Los Angeles Raiders players
Hamilton Tiger-Cats players
Las Vegas Posse players